Changsha High-Tech Industrial Development Zone (abbr: CSHTZ) is a national high-tech industrial zone in Changsha City, Hunan Province, China. It is the original Changsha Technology Development Experimental Zone founded in July, 1988. It was renamed to the present name, meanwhile the zone was upgraded to one of first batch of national HTZs. In March 1991, and became a national innovative technology pilot zone approved by the Ministry of Science & Technology in 2009.

The CSHTZ consists of Yuelu Mountain Hi-Tech Park, Xingsha Industrial Hi-Tech Park, Longping High-Tech Park, Broad Hi-Tech Park and City Proper Policy District, of which the Yuelu Mountain Hi-Tech Park is its core industrial park directly managed by CSHTZ. Yuelu Mountain Hi-Tech Park is also called "Luvalley".

The pillar industries in CSHTZ are service outsourcing, environmental protection, new materials, new energy, biomedicine, electronic information and advanced manufacturing. As of 2015, the total business income of enterprises in the zone reaches 425.1 billion yuan (US$68.25 billion), the gross output value of industry is 379.2 billion yuan (US$60.88 billion). of which the total business income in Luvalley is 250 billion yuan (US$40.14 billion), its added value of scale-sized industries is 36.78 billion yuan (US$5.91 billion).

References

External links

Yuelu District
Economy of Changsha
1988 establishments in China
Special Economic Zones of China